PELVIS syndrome is a congenital condition characterized by perineal hemangioma, external genitalia malformations, lipomyelomeningocele, vesicorenal abnormalities, imperforate anus, and skin tag.

See also 
 SACRAL syndrome
 List of cutaneous conditions

References

Cutaneous congenital anomalies